Lo'ai Salem Atallah Al-Amaireh (born October 2, 1978) is a retired Jordanian footballer.

Honors and Participation in International Tournaments

In Pan Arab Games 
2011 Pan Arab Games

In WAFF Championships 
2002 WAFF Championship
2007 WAFF Championship
2008 WAFF Championship

References

External links 
 
 
 
 
 

 

1978 births
Living people
Jordanian footballers
Jordan international footballers
Association football goalkeepers
2004 AFC Asian Cup players
2011 AFC Asian Cup players
Sahab SC players
Al-Faisaly SC players
Shabab Al-Ordon Club players
Jordanian Pro League players